Paul Lavon Davis (April 21, 1948 – April 22, 2008) was an American singer and songwriter, best known for his radio hits and solo career which started worldwide in 1970. His career encompassed soul, country, and pop. His most successful songs are 1977's "I Go Crazy", a No. 7 pop hit which once held the record for the longest chart run on the Billboard Hot 100, and 1982's "'65 Love Affair", which at No. 6 is his highest-charting single. Another pop hit, "Cool Night", was released in 1981. In the mid-1980s, he also had two No. 1 country hits as a guest vocalist on songs by Marie Osmond and Tanya Tucker.

Career
Davis was born in Meridian, Mississippi, United States. He was a member of a local group called the Six Soul Survivors around 1966 and later in another group called the Endless Chain. In 1968, he was a writer for Malaco Records, based in Jackson, Mississippi. Ilene Berns, widow of Bert Berns, signed Davis to Bang Records in 1969, and in 1970, released a cover version of The Jarmels' hit "A Little Bit of Soap", reaching No. 52 on the Billboard Hot 100. His first album, A Little Bit of Paul Davis, was released in 1970. In 1974, he recorded his third album, Ride 'Em Cowboy, and the title track, his first top 40 single, peaked at No. 23 on January 18, 1975. (The same song became a Top 40 Country hit for Juice Newton in 1984.) Davis also reached No. 35 in September 1976 with "Superstar", a tribute song not related to any of the 1971 hits by that name.

Davis had his first American Top 10 single with the ballad "I Go Crazy," which after 30 weeks on the Hot 100 peaked at No. 7 on March 18, 1978.  "I Go Crazy" spent 40 weeks on the Billboard Hot 100, which at the time set the record for most weeks on the chart.   The follow-up, "Sweet Life", also did well, peaking at No. 17.  On May 17, 1980, his gospel-tinged "Do Right" peaked at No. 23, and Casey Kasem noted the religious aspects of this song, along with other songs before it, on that day's edition of American Top 40.  Davis was active on Bang Records when the label folded in the early 1980s.

After one more album on the Bang label, Davis signed with Arista Records in 1981 and scored two more hits, "Cool Night" (which in February 1982 reached No. 11 on the Hot 100 and No. 2 on the Adult Contemporary chart) and "'65 Love Affair" (a Top 10 hit on both charts). "Cool Night" has been listed as an example of yacht rock. His Arista debut album spawned a third hit with a remake of "Love or Let Me Be Lonely". The single contained a third verse of music which was not included on the album version, and despite its Top 40 and AC success, had never been reissued on any CD release until Wounded Bird reissued the Best of Paul Davis compilation in 2011. Davis retired from making records for a time, except for two duets that went to No. 1 on the Billboard Hot Country Singles chart. The first was in 1986 with Marie Osmond singing "You're Still New to Me"; while the second, in 1988, was a collaboration with Tanya Tucker and Paul Overstreet singing "I Won't Take Less Than Your Love". Davis also wrote "Meet Me in Montana", which his friend Dan Seals and Osmond took to No. 1 on the Billboard country chart in 1985, and "Bop", a solo No. 1 country hit for Seals in early 1986.

Personal life and death
Davis was an avid golfer, and was also an avid billiards enthusiast. His father was a preacher. Paul Davis survived a shooting in Nashville, Tennessee, on July 29, 1986. He was leaving a hotel on Music Row with a female companion when an unidentified man walked up, demanded his wallet, and shot him in the abdomen.

He was married to Pamela Gayle Jay Davis, who enjoyed a brief career with Bang Records/Web IV Music in Atlanta, where Davis was writing and recording his songs. When their only son Jonathan was born with special needs, Pamela retired from the music world to care for him. She died on March 20, 2017. Paul Davis died of a heart attack at the Rush Foundation Hospital in Meridian, Mississippi, on April 22, 2008, a day after his 60th birthday.

Discography

Albums

Singles

Guest singles

Soundtrack appearances

References

External links

Paul Davis discography
 
Paul Davis interview

1948 births
2008 deaths
American male singer-songwriters
Singer-songwriters from Mississippi
American country pianists
American organists
American country keyboardists
American country rock singers
American country singer-songwriters
American soft rock musicians
Musicians from Meridian, Mississippi
American shooting survivors
20th-century American singers
American soul singers
American soul keyboardists
Arista Records artists
Country musicians from Mississippi
20th-century American male singers
20th-century American keyboardists